James Robbins "Bob" Gardiner (March 19, 1951 – April 21, 2005) was a multi-talented artist, painter, cartoonist,  animator, holographer, musician, storyteller, and comedy writer. He invented the stop-motion 3-D clay animation technique which his collaborator Will Vinton would later market as Claymation, although Bob preferred the term Sculptimation for his frame-by-frame method of sculpting plasticine clay characters and sets.

He and Vinton shared the 1974 Academy Award for Best Animated Short Film for Closed Mondays. The film was preserved by the Academy Film Archive in 2012.

Gardiner killed himself on April 21, 2005, while living at the Everhart Hotel in downtown Grass Valley.

Filmography
 Closed Mondays (1974), writer, art direction, and sculptimation
 Mountain Music (1975), art direction and sculptimation (uncredited)

Graphic art

Accolades
Gardiner and Vinton won the Oscar for Best Animated Short in 1975 for Closed Mondays (1974).

Long time friend, Richard Livoni had this to say about "Closed Mondays":

"This is my college room mate and best friend Bob Gardiner's, 2nd film. We invented "Claymation" after seeing an old black and white film called "Permutations". It was a film that our other room mate Will Vinton brought from the Berkeley film library where he worked at the time. Once we saw that, we borrowed an old movie camera from Will. It had the ability to snap a couple of frames at a time. We set up some lights and a tripod and started our first film. It would take us days to get 30 seconds of animated stuff. That first movie won the Berkeley Film Festival! I had to get real and stop cutting classes at California College of Arts (where Bob and I attended) But, Bob went all in. That next film that he made in our dining room was "Closed Mondays". I'll never forget when they announced that he had won an Academy Award. He was the one who came up with the name Claymation btw. Will Vinton was the guy who happened to own the camera so he kinda rode on Bob's coat tails. Later he was the guy who did the California Raisins commercials. Bob was a troubled, complicated, hilarious genius. I was lucky to be his friend. R.I.P. Bob! Richard "Blitz" Livoni."<ref>

See also

Closed Mondays (1974)

References

External links
Bob Gardiner at Internet Movie Database
 Rolling Stone Magazine: The 10th Anniversary (1977), Main Title Animation of The Rubinoos, at Internet Movie Database
Rolling Stone Magazine: The 10th Anniversary (1977) on YouTube
 Mountain Music (1975) on YouTube 
 Mountain Music (1975) on IMDB

1951 births
2005 deaths
People from Torrance, California
American animators
Clay animators
Producers who won the Best Animated Short Academy Award
Directors of Best Animated Short Academy Award winners